Biledulgerid (Bilādu l-Jarīd, "country of dates") was formerly a country in Northern Africa, south of Mount Atlas, bounded on the north by Tunis, on the west by Algiers and the Sahara, on the east by Tripoli, supposed to be about 180 miles square.

Contemporary account
According to the 1830 edition of the Encyclopedia Americana, the population was composed of Berbers, black Africans and Arabs.

One late 18th century source (William Carey, "An Enquiry Into the Obligation of Christians to Use Means for the Conversion of the Heathens") gave the dimensions of Biledulgerid as 2,500 miles in length and 350 miles in breadth with a population of 3.5 million.  The country's religions are listed as "Mahometans, Christians, and Jews."

References

Regions of Africa
Former countries in Africa